This is a list of distilleries in the U.S. state of Georgia.

There are two distilleries in the city limits of Georgia's state capital, Atlanta, another two in the greater metropolitan area of Atlanta, and two in Georgia's third-largest city, Savannah.

Table

See also 

 Blue laws in the United States

References 

Georgia
Distilleries
American cuisine-related lists